The Chiefs Manawa (officially called the Waitomo Chiefs Manawa for sponsorship reasons) are a New Zealand women's professional rugby union team based in Hamilton, New Zealand that competes in the Super Rugby Aupiki competition.

Chiefs Manawa won the inaugural season of the Super Rugby Aupiki competition. They went undefeated throughout the season and beat the Blues Women 35–0 in the final round to claim the title.

History

Historic clash 
The Chiefs and Blues women created history when they clashed in the first-ever women's Super Rugby match in New Zealand on 1 May 2021. The game was hosted by the Blues at Eden Park and was played as a double header before the Round 10 Super Rugby Aotearoa match between their men's teams. The Chiefs were sponsored by the Waitomo Group, which is a Waikato-based fuel company, and were named Waitomo Wahine Chiefs.

The Chiefs proved too good for the Blues women and dealt them a major defeat in their historic match. They won 39–12 as both teams exhibited their skills and scored some impressive tries.

Super Rugby Aupiki announcement; Squad and Coaching team named 
On 6 October 2021, New Zealand Rugby confirmed an elite Four-team women’s competition called Super Rugby Aupiki for March 2022. The competition would run for four weeks with the women being paid for their participation.

The Chiefs released a list of player signings along with the other three teams in November 2021. The coaching set-up was announced later with Allan Bunting named as Head Coach, he would be assisted by Crystal Kaua and Rodney Gibbs.

Team name and identity 
The Chiefs unveiled their new name and the jersey the women's team would be using in the inaugural season of Super Rugby Aupiki. It was revealed that the team would be known as Chiefs Manawa. The word Manawa is derived from two words – mana and wāhine. The Chiefs Mana being a "central pillar of the club and wāhine being the most identifiable feature of the team."

Newly appointed Head coach, Allan Bunting, led the process of developing the new team identity together with the Chiefs head coach Clayton McMillan, New Zealand Rugby's Māori cultural advisor Luke Crawford, Chiefs jersey designer Dave Burke, Chiefs general manager Kate Rawnsley and a number of players.

The team jersey was also unveiled at the same time, the most important aspect of the design is the mangōpare (the hammerhead shark) – the design depicting "determination and tenacity"; When viewed from another angle the pattern depicts the Manawa (beating heart) shape. Incorporated into the jersey is the Te Raranga Harakeke – the flax weave - "which connects to the more feminine art of weaving." It sits in behind the flowing design of the kōwhaiwhai pattern which "represents the connecting waterways flowing in the Chiefs contributing regions."

Inaugural season Champions 
Chiefs Manawa played Matatū in a pre-season game ahead of the inaugural Super Rugby Aupiki season, they won a 28–20.

Chiefs Manawa faced Matatū again in the opening match of the Super Rugby Aupiki season. They were victorious after a hard-fought match with a score of 17–15. They then met Hurricanes Poua in round two, they ran in five tries to win their second game 29–8 and remain unbeaten.

The final round saw them face-off against the Blues as they kept them scoreless with a 35–0 win and crowned the first champions of Super Rugby Aupiki.

2023 
Crystal Kaua was appointed as the new Head Coach of Chiefs Manawa for the 2023 Super Rugby Aupiki season.

Current squad 
On 21 November 2022, the squad for the 2023 Super Rugby Aupiki season was announced.

Current coaches and management 

 Head Coach: Crystal Kaua
 Assistant Coach: –
 Assistant Coach: Rodney Gibbs
 Manager: Gareth Duncan
 Doctor: Deb Robinson
 Physio: Sian Northy
 Strength and Conditioning Coach: Nick Marquet
 Video: Leah Dickey

Captains

Coaches 

Notes: Official Super Rugby Aupiki competition matches only, including finals.

References

External links 

 Official website

2021 establishments in New Zealand
Super Rugby Aupiki
New Zealand rugby union teams
Rugby clubs established in 2021
Sport in Waikato